Denver Ports of Call is a defunct United States private airline which operated flights for the Denver-based Ports of Call Travel Club from 1967 to 1992. In its heyday, Ports of Call was the largest travel club in the United States, with at one time over 66,000 members.

History 

Ports of Call was established in 1966 as a travel club in Denver, Colorado. The travel club had a private terminal separate from the main public terminal at Stapleton International, and operated their own domestic and international trips using specially outfitted private aircraft. They began by using large 4-engine piston and turboprop aircraft such as the Douglas DC-7 and the Lockheed L-188 Electra. The pilots were initially commercial airline employees who flew Ports of Call aircraft in their off time, and later were full-time employees. The flight attendants stayed with each travel club group on a trip for up to a month as group tour guides.

As Ports of Call grew, more modern jet aircraft such as the Convair 990, Boeing 707 and Boeing 727 were acquired on the second hand market. By 1986, Ports of Call operated 11 Boeing 707-300 airliners, a B707-100, and a single B727-100 with club membership exceeding 66,000. The club was widely visible from the Ports of Call Travel Club stickers displayed on many automobiles around Denver, throughout Colorado and the surrounding states. One trip in the mid eighties was "Around the World" and circumnavigated the globe with multiple stops. Another trip was the annual "Mystery Trip", in which members signed up to be taken on a trip to an unknown destination. This event was so popular, the club would fill multiple B707s with nearly 800 people per trip.

Because of federally mandated aircraft noise restrictions, the company went public to raise funding to pay for the required hush kits on the aircraft. In an effort to increase aircraft use, the aircraft began operating as a separate charter company after being rebranded as Skyworld Airlines under FAR part 121, enabling them to operate non-travel club charter services as well. In the wake of public ownership, and after several leadership changes, the company essentially suffered a hostile take over. The new controlling interests liquidated the aircraft assets and shut down the airline portion, remaining open as a travel club sans-aircraft. They sold just one of the B707 jetliners, a "combi aircraft" (having been originally built by Boeing to be easily convertible to transport a mix of passengers and freight on the main deck or as a cargo only freighter) for over $4 million.

The travel club subsequently was forced to book member trips in blocks of seats on commercial airlines. Part of the mystique of the travel club genre of airlines was the enjoyment of special treatment. Instead of club members boarding private aircraft from a terminal, groups were now shuttled to Stapleton terminal to board whatever commercial flights were available to the trip destinations, although they were accompanied by a POC tour guide. With the loss of their own aircraft and the ability to fly directly to any desired destination, they were reduced to offering only the multiple connecting flights available commercially. As a direct result, club membership renewals quickly plummeted and the travel club closed in 1994.

Fleet
 Boeing 707
 Boeing 727-100
 Convair 990
 Douglas DC-7
 Lockheed L-188 Electra

See also 
 List of defunct airlines of the United States

External links

 "Ports of Call Returns to the Air," The Denver Business Journal,(October 10, 2000).
 Grounded Series episode on the rise and fall of Denver Ports of Call

Defunct airlines of the United States
Defunct companies based in Denver
Defunct companies based in Colorado
American companies established in 1967
American companies disestablished in 1992
Airlines established in 1967
Airlines disestablished in 1992